Grauert is a surname. Notable people with the surname include:

 Hans Grauert (1930–2011), German mathematician
 Héctor Grauert (1907–1991), Uruguayan lawyer and politician 
 Julio César Grauert (1902–1933), Uruguayan journalist and politician
 Ulrich Grauert (1889–1941), German Luftwaffe general